Monopis burmanni is a moth of the family Tineidae. It is found in Austria, Poland and Russia (Ural).

References

Moths described in 1979
Tineinae